Francis Gemmell Fulton Walker (1897–1949) was a Scottish professional footballer who made over 180 appearances as an inside forward in the Scottish League for Third Lanark. He was capped by Scotland at international level.

Personal life 
Walker attended Paisley Grammar School and his two older brothers, Willie and Jim, also played football for Queen's Park. After leaving school, he took up a job as a civil servant. In March 1917, during the First World War, Walker was called up to serve with the Royal Field Artillery. Holding the rank of bombardier, he was part of the Army of Occupation and was stationed in Cologne. After retiring from football due to a broken leg, Walker became an income tax inspector.

References

1897 births
1949 deaths
Scottish footballers
Queen's Park F.C. players
Third Lanark A.C. players
Scottish Football League players
Association football inside forwards
British Army personnel of World War I
Association football goalkeepers
Royal Field Artillery soldiers
Footballers from Renfrewshire
People educated at Paisley Grammar School
Scottish civil servants
Scotland international footballers
Date of death missing